Nazarene Theological College may refer to:

 Nazarene Theological College (Australia) in Thornlands, Queensland
 Nazarene Theological College (England) in Didsbury, Manchester

See also
Nazarene Theological Seminary, a Christian seminary affiliated with the Church of the Nazarene